The 4th Edda Awards were held on 10 November 2002 in the National Theater of Iceland in Reykjavik. The awards were hosted by TV presenters Valgerður Matthíasdóttir and the previous year's Best Television Personality Logi Bergmann Eiðsson.

The Professional Awards were divided into three categories (Screenplay, Visual Design and Sound and Cinematography). Short films got their own category as well. As in previous years the public was able to cast their votes online. The Icelandic Film and Television Academy had 70% say in the results and the public 30%. Except for the Best Television Personality where the public had 100% say in the results. Around 800 people cast their votes online up to the awards.

The film Hafið, directed by Baltasar Kormákur received most nominations. The film was nominated for twelve awards in nine categories and won eight. Kormákur personally won two of those awards for directing and screenwriting. He dedicated his Best Film award to the National Theater of Iceland with these words: "Án leikhússins væri kvikmyndagerðin fátækari" ("Without this theater filmmaking would be poor"). And that it pleased him to see so many great actors who had worked in the theater receive their awards that evening.

Another interesting film among the critics was the animated children's film , which was nominated in two categories and won one award.

Best Actor Gunnar Eyjólfsson was away with the Icelandic national chess team in Slovenia on the night of the ceremony, and accepted his award through Kormákur's mobilephone to great amusement.

New Categories 
 Edda Award for Best Visual Design
 Edda Award for Best Sound and Cinema Photography
 Edda Award for Best Short Film
 Edda Award for Best Music Video

Results 

The nominees and winners were: (Winners highlighted in bold)

Best Film:
 Fálkar, directed by Friðrik Þór Friðriksson
 Hafið, directed by Baltasar Kormákur
 Regína, directed by María Sigurðardóttir
Best Director:
 Baltasar Kormákur, for Hafið
 Gunnar Karlsson, for 
 Óskar Jónasson, for 20/2020/20 og Áramótaskaupið 2001
Best Actor:
 Gunnar Eyjólfsson, for Hafið
 Hilmir Snær Guðnason, for Hafið and Reykjavík Guesthouse Rent a Bike
 Keith Carradine, for Fálkar
Best Actress:
 Elva Ósk Ólafsdóttir, for Hafið
 Guðrún S. Gísladóttir, for Hafið
 Halldóra Geirharðsdóttir, for Regína
Best Supporting Actor:
 Jón Sigurbjörnsson, for 20/20
 Sigurður Skúlason, for Hafið and Gemsar
 Þorsteinn Guðmundsson, for Maður eins og ég
Best Supporting Actress:
 Herdís Þorvaldsdóttir, for Hafið
 Kristbjörg Kjeld, for Hafið
 Sólveig Arnarsdóttir, for Regína
Best Screenplay:
 Baltasar Kormákur and Ólafur Haukur Símonarson, for Hafið
 Árni Óli Ásgeirsson and Róbert Douglas, for Maður eins og ég
 Árni Þórarinsson and Páll Pálsson, for 20/20
Best Sound and Cinema Photography:
 Harald Paalgarrd, for cinema photography in Fálkar 
 Sigurður Sverrir Pálsson, for cinema photography in Málarinn og sálmurinn hans um litinn
 Valdís Óskarsdóttir, for editing in Hafið
Best Visual Design:
 Ásta Ríkharðsdóttir, for set design in Hvernig sem við reynum and Allir hlutir fallegir
 Gunnar Karlsson, for creative direction in 
 Tonie Jan Zetterström, for set design in Hafið
Best Documentary:
 Tyrkjaránið
 
 Noi, Pam og mennirnir þeirra
 Möhöguleikar
 Í skóm drekans
Best television program (staged):
 Áramótaskaupið 2001
 Í faðmi hafsins
 20/20
Best Television Program:
 Sjálfstætt fólk
 HM 4-4-2
 Af fingrum fram
 Fólk með Sirrý
 Ísland í bítið
Best News Anchor:
 Árni Snævarr, for Stöð 2 News
 Brynhildur Ólafsdóttir, for Stöð 2 News
 G. Pétur Mattíasson, for RÚV News
Best Short Film:
 
 Memphis
Best Music Video:
 Land & synir – If, directed by Samúel Bjarki Pétursson and Gunnar Páll Ólafsson
 Sálin hans Jóns míns – Á nýjum stað, directed by Samúel Bjarki Pétursson and Gunnar Páll Ólafsson
 Stuðmenn - Hvernig sem ég reyni, directed by Ragnar Bragason
Best Television Personality:
 Sverrir Sverrisson (Sveppi) 
Honorary Award: 
 Magnús Magnússon, for a 40-year career in television.

External links 
 Edda Awards official website

References 

Edda Awards
2002 film awards